An annular solar eclipse will occur on Friday, November 4, 2078. A solar eclipse occurs when the Moon passes between Earth and the Sun, thereby totally or partly obscuring the image of the Sun for a viewer on Earth. An annular solar eclipse occurs when the Moon's apparent diameter is smaller than the Sun's, blocking most of the Sun's light and causing the Sun to look like an annulus (ring). An annular eclipse appears as a partial eclipse over a region of the Earth thousands of kilometres wide. The path of annularity will cross Pacific Ocean, South America, and Atlantic Ocean. The tables below contain detailed predictions and additional information on the Annular Solar Eclipse of 4 November 2078.

Eclipse Magnitude = 0.92551

Eclipse Obscuration = 0.85657

Gamma = -0.22852

Greatest Eclipse = 04 Nov 2078 16:53:57.5 UTC (16:55:44.4 TD)

Delta T = 1 minute, 46.9 seconds

Annularity Duration at Greatest Eclipse = 8 minutes, 29 seconds, 80 milliseconds

Annularity Duration at Greatest Duration = 8 minutes, 31 seconds, 940 milliseconds

Path Width at Greatest Eclipse = 287.5 km (178.6 mi)

Path Width at Greatest Duration = 286.0 km (177.7 mi)

Moon diameter = 1764.8 arcseconds

Sun diameter = 1935.0 arcseconds

Moon declination = 15 degrees, 49 minutes, 24.5 seconds south of the Celestial equator

Sun declination = 15 degrees, 38 minutes, 7.6 seconds south of the Celestial equator

Moon right ascension = 14 hours, 40 minutes, 33.5 seconds

Sun right ascension = 14 hours, 40 minutes, 53.9 seconds

Eclipse season 

This is the second eclipse this season.

First eclipse this season: 21 October 2078 - Penumbral Lunar Eclipse (Lunar Saros 118)

Third eclipse this season: 19 November 2078 - Penumbral Lunar Eclipse (Lunar Saros 156)

Related eclipses

Solar eclipses 2076–2079

Saros 144 

It is a part of Saros cycle 144, repeating every 18 years, 11 days, containing 70 events. The series started with partial solar eclipse on April 11, 1736. It contains annular eclipses from July 7, 1880 through August 27, 2565. There are no total eclipses in the series. The series ends at member 70 as a partial eclipse on May 5, 2980. The longest duration of annularity will be 9 minutes, 52 seconds on December 29, 2168.
<noinclude>

Tritos series

Metonic cycle

References

External links 

2078 11 4
2078 in science
2078 11 4
2078 11 4